The Hunter 146 is an American sailing dinghy that was designed by Chuck Burns and the Hunter Design Team as a novice sailboat and first built in 2003.

The design was renamed the Hunter 15 in 2008 and is now referred to as the Marlow-Hunter 15.

Production
The design has been built by Hunter Marine in the United States, starting in 2003 and remains in production under the designation Marlow-Hunter 15.

Design
The Hunter 146 is a small recreational dinghy, built predominantly of ACP. It has a fractional sloop rig, a raked stem, an open reverse transom, a transom-hung rudder controlled by a tiller and a retractable centerboard. It displaces  and can accommodate up to four people.

See also
List of sailing boat types

Related development
Hunter 140
Hunter 170
Marlow-Hunter 18

Similar sailboats
Laser 2

References

External links

Dinghies
2000s sailboat type designs
Sailboat type designs by Chuck Burns
Sailboat type designs by Hunter Design Team
Sailboat types built by Hunter Marine